Robert Shirley, 7th Earl Ferrers FSA DL (21 September 1756 –  2 May 1827), styled Viscount Tamworth from 1778 to 1787, was a British nobleman.

Early life
The eldest son of Robert Shirley, he became a courtesy viscount after his father succeeded his brother in the earldom in 1778.

Career
On 4 July 1781, both Ferrers and Tamworth were appointed deputy lieutenants for Derbyshire. He succeeded his father in the earldom in 1787.

Ferrers was named a Fellow of the Society of Antiquaries of London in 1788, and was much interested in genealogy.

Personal life
Robert married Elizabeth Prentiss (d. 14 September 1799) on 13 March 1778 at St Leonard's, Shoreditch. They had one son:

 Robert Sewallis Shirley, Viscount Tamworth (1778–1824), who married Hon. Sophia Caroline Curzon, daughter of Nathaniel Curzon, 2nd Baron Scarsdale, on 5 August 1800; he purchased a commission as cornet and sub-lieutenant in the 2nd Regiment of Life Guards on 6 October 1798, was promoted into the 1st Regiment of Foot Guards as a lieutenant on 4 November 1800, and retired from the Army in January 1802. He was commissioned major of the Derby Regiment of Volunteer Infantry (militia) on 26 April 1804.

He married his second wife, Elizabeth Mundy (d. 22 February 1827), daughter of Wrightson Mundy, on 28 September 1799, by whom he left no issue. Since his son predeceased him, he was succeeded by his brother Washington when he died at Hastings in 1827 aged 70. The Earl and his second wife were both buried at Breedon on the Hill.

Legacy
Although his son died without legitimate issue; he left a natural daughter, Caroline Shirley (1818–1897). He left the family estates at Ragdale and Ratcliffe on the Wreake, Leicestershire, which had descended from the Basset family, to his granddaughter Caroline, later Duchess Sforza Cesarini.

References

1756 births
1827 deaths
Deputy Lieutenants of Derbyshire
07
Fellows of the Society of Antiquaries of London